Erakor Golden Star F.C. is a Vanuatuan football team based in Port Vila. Their motto is 'Yesu Iwi' which means God is good.

They play in the Port Vila Premier League, the Port Vila`s top football competition. In 2016 they became champions, which meant that they qualified for the OFC Champions League for the first time in the history of the club.

Achievements
Port Vila Football League:1
Winners: 2016
Runners-up: 2012–13, 2013–14, 2014–15
Previous champions 1977 1978 1980 1987 1988 1989. Participated in the French Cup (Coupe de France) in 1977 in  Noumea New Caledonia and in Tahiti in 1978.

Current squad
Squad for the 2019-20 Port Vila Premier League:

Current technical staff

References

Football clubs in Vanuatu
Port Vila
Association football clubs established in 1926
1926 establishments in Oceania